Germany was represented by six-member group Atlantis 2000, with the song "Dieser Traum darf niemals sterben", at the 1991 Eurovision Song Contest, which took place on 4 May in Rome. "Dieser Traum darf niemals sterben" was the winner of the German national final, held on 21 March.

Before Eurovision

Ein Lied für Rom 
The final was held at the Friedrichstadtpalast in Berlin, hosted by Hape Kerkeling. Ten songs took part and the winner was chosen by a panel of 1,000 people, selected as providing a representative cross-section of the German public, who were telephoned and asked to choose their favourite song. One of the other participants was Cindy Berger, who had represented Germany at Eurovision in 1974 as half of duo Cindy & Bert.

The choice of "Dieser Traum darf niemals sterben" was widely criticised, as many felt that not only was the song itself not particularly strong, but that also the anthemic 'peace, love and hope for the future' style of song was at the time becoming something of a Eurovision cliché (the 1990 contest had seen a plethora of such lyrically-themed entries).

At Eurovision
On the night of the final Atlantis 2000 performed 17th in the running order, following Finland and preceding Belgium. At the close of voting "Dieser Traum darf niemals sterben" had received only 10 points, placing Germany 18th of the 22 entries, the country's lowest Eurovision finish to that date. The German jury awarded its 12 points to contest winners Sweden.

Atlantis 2000 had been set up specifically to participate at Eurovision and following the bad result in Rome, and the song's failure to achieve significant sales success in Germany, they disbanded soon after.

Voting

References

1991
Countries in the Eurovision Song Contest 1991
Eurovision
Eurovision